Philipp Nicolai (10 August 1556 – 26 October 1608) was a German Lutheran pastor, poet, and composer. He is most widely recognized as a hymnodist.

Biography
Philipp Nicolai was born at  Mengeringhausen in Waldeck, Hesse, Germany where his father was a Lutheran pastor. His early education include studies at Kassel in Hesse, Hildesheim in Lower Saxony and Dortmund in Westphalia.  He studied theology at the University of Erfurt where he was a pupil of Ludwig Helmbold.

In  1583, he was ordained to the Lutheran ministry and was appointed minister at Herdecke. He was subsequently expelled during the Counter-Reformation. In 1588, he became pastor at Altwildungen in Hesse.  He graduated with a Doctorate Degree in Theology from  the University of Wittenberg in  1594. In 1596, he became the minister at Unna in Westphalia. In 1601,  he was elected chief pastor of St. Katherine's Church (Katharinenkirche) in Hamburg.

He was the author of two famous hymns: Wachet auf, ruft uns die Stimme and Wie schön leuchtet der Morgenstern, sometimes referred to as the King and Queen of Chorales, respectively. These two chorales have inspired many composers, including Johann Sebastian Bach, whose chorale cantatas Wie schön leuchtet der Morgenstern, BWV 1, and Wachet auf, ruft uns die Stimme, BWV 140, are based on them. Bach's organ transcription of the latter, as published in the Schübler Chorales, has become world famous. Nicolai is supposed to be the last example of the Meistersinger tradition, in which words and music, text and melody stem from one and the same person.

Philipp Nicolai is commemorated in the Calendar of Saints of the Lutheran Church on 26 October together with hymnodists Johann Heermann and Paul Gerhardt.

Hymns
 Wachet auf! ruft uns die Stimme (Eng: Wake, O wake! With tidings thrilling)
 “Wie schön leuchtet”

See also
Lutheran orthodoxy

References

Other sources
Glover, Raymond F. (1990) The Hymnal 1982 Companion, Volume One  (Church Publishing Inc)  
Crump, William D.  (2013) The Christmas encyclopedia (McFarland & Company, 3rd ed.)

Further reading
 Philipp Nicolai 1556-1608 (The Cyber Hymnal).
 Philipp Nicolai Society  Wittenberg Trail).
 Studies In Lutheran Chorales by Hilton C. Oswald, Edited by Bruce R. Backer.

1556 births
1608 deaths
People from Bad Arolsen
People from Waldeck (state)
German poets
University of Wittenberg alumni
People celebrated in the Lutheran liturgical calendar
German Lutheran hymnwriters
German male writers
German-language poets